John A. Hennessy (1859 - April 22, 1951), was a newspaper editor and a special investigator for Governor Sulzer in the Tammany Hall corruption trial of 1913.

Biography
He was a member of the New York State Assembly in 1893 (Kings Co., 8th D.), 1894 and 1895 (both Kings Co., 2nd D.).

He died on April 22, 1951 in Brooklyn.

References

External links
John A. Hennessy from the Library of Congress at Flickr

1859 births
1951 deaths
Members of the New York State Assembly
People from Brooklyn